Schwenningdorf is a village in the parish of Rödinghausen in the northeastern part of the German federal state of North Rhine-Westphalia. Until 1968 Schwenningdorf was an independent parish in the Amt of Rödinghausen. The village was first mentioned in the records in 1088.

Location 
The village of Schwenningdorf lies to the north of Rödinghausen on the slopes of the Wiehen Hills.

The valley of the Aue and its neighbouring valleys Wehmerhorster Wiesental and the region of the  Schierenbeke are nature reserves.

Population 
The following overview shows the population figures for Schwenningdorf based on the respective parish area until its incorporation into the parish of Rödinghausen on 1 January 1969. Changes in the parish boundary occurred due to the incorporation of the settlements in the Bieren area on 4 March 1898 (1895: 10 inhabitants) and 1 April 1932 (1925: 2 inhabitants). The figures given are census returns. From 1871 and for 1946 the returns were based on the population present in the village, and from 1925 on the actual residential population. Before 1871 the censuses were not based on standard criteria.

References 

Villages in North Rhine-Westphalia